Admiral Sir William Thomas Pillar,  (24 February 1924 – 18 March 1999) was a senior Royal Navy officer who served as Chief of Naval Support and a member of the Admiralty.

Naval career
Educated at Blundell's School and latterly at the Royal Naval Engineering College, Pillar joined the Royal Navy as a cadet in 1942 during the Second World War. He was promoted to sub-lieutenant (Engineering Branch) on 1 June 1944. An acting lieutenant at the war's end, he was promoted to substantive lieutenant (E) on 3 June 1947 (seniority 1 October 1945). Following service in the Korean War he was promoted to lieutenant-commander (E) on 1 October 1953, to commander (E) on 31 December 1958 and to captain (E) on 31 December 1966.

Pillar was appointed Assistant to the Director-General, Ships in 1970 and Commander of the Royal Naval Engineering College in 1973. Attaining flag rank as a rear admiral on 7 January 1976, he was made Port Admiral at Rosyth and then Assistant Chief of Fleet Support. Promoted to vice admiral on 2 April 1979, he became the first Royal Navy engineer officer to be Chief of Fleet Support. He was appointed a Knight Commander of the Order of the Bath in the 1980 Birthday Honours, and was promoted to admiral on 5 January 1982. In 1982, he became Commandant of the Royal College of Defence Studies. Appointed a Knight Grand Cross of the Order of the British Empire in the 1983 Birthday Honours, he retired on 6 March 1984.

On retirement from the Royal Navy Pillar became Lieutenant-Governor and Commander-in-Chief of Jersey.
He was also Commodore and later Life Vice-Commodore of the Royal Navy Sailing Association, a member of the Royal Yacht Squadron, President of the Royal Navy Modern Pentathlon Association and a Knight of St. John.

Family
In 1946 Pillar married Ursula Ransley; they had three sons and a daughter.

References

|-

|-

1924 births
1999 deaths
People educated at Blundell's School
Royal Navy admirals
Lords of the Admiralty
Knights Grand Cross of the Order of the British Empire
Knights Commander of the Order of the Bath
Governors of Jersey
Fellows of the Institution of Mechanical Engineers
Royal Navy officers of World War II
Royal Navy personnel of the Korean War